Panchthupi (also spelled Panch Thupi) is a village in the Burwan CD block in the Kandi subdivision of Murshidabad district in the state of West Bengal, India.

Geography

Location

Area overview
The area shown in the map alongside, covering Berhampore and Kandi subdivisions, is spread across both the natural physiographic regions of the district, Rarh and Bagri. The headquarters of Murshidabad district, Berhampore, is in this area. The entire area is overwhelmingly rural with over 80% of the population living in the rural areas.

Note: The map alongside presents some of the notable locations in the subdivisions. All places marked in the map are linked in the larger full screen map.

Demographics
According to the 2011 Census of India, Panch Thupi had a total population of 7,956, of which 4,092 (51%) were males and 3,864 (50%) were females. Population in the age range 0–6 years was 1,117. The total number of literate persons in Panch Thupi was 4,445 (64.99% of the population over 6 years).

Transport
Dak Bangla Road links Panchthupi to State Highway 7 running from Rajgram (in Birbhum district) to Midnapore (in Paschim Medinipur district).

Education
Panchthupi Haripada Gouribala College was established in 1996 at Panchthupi. Affiliated with the University of Kalyani it offers honours courses in Bengali, English, Sanskrit, philosophy, political science and history. It offers general courses in Bengali, English, Sanskrit, Arabic, philosophy, political science and history.

Sunil Dhar Memorial B.P.Ed. College, a college for physical education, was established at Panchthupi in 2007.

There is a high school named Panchthupi T.N. Institution which was established in 1904 by Troilokya nath Adhikari.
There is a girls' high School named sri Sri Ram Krishna Sarada Balika Vidyapith which is the second girls' high school in Kandi subdivision. This school was established in 1954. Besides these are three primary school and three private primary school at Panchthupi.

Culture
There is a group of mounds, possibly five, indicating the remains of a stupa, as signified by the name Panchthupi. It is known as Barkona Deul Mound

According to the List of Monuments of National Importance in West Bengal, the mound known as Barkona Deul Mound at Panchthupi  is an ASI listed monument.

Healthcare
There is a Primary Health Centre at Panchthupi (with 10 beds).

References

Villages in Murshidabad district